The Midas Bronze is a Mini-based kit car designed by Richard Oakes and manufactured by D&H Fibreglass Techniques, set up by Harold Dermott and Maurice Holt in 1975. Their initial production facility was in Oldham, England, but when they outgrew that they moved to larger premises in Corby.

The Midas was the first original vehicle from D&H, which had been started to build the Mini Marcos. Richard Oakes, an established kit car designer, was commissioned to develop the new car, the design of which was complete by early 1978. A prototype version of the Midas was shown that year at the Performance Car Show at London's Alexandra Palace, to an "enthusiastic" reception. The Midas was offered as a complete kit, minus engine and gearbox, for £3250; the first deliveries were made in 1979. Fifty-seven Mark 1s were produced before the introduction of the Mark 2 in 1981.

Construction
The Midas is built around an all-composite monocoque body shell of "exceptional quality". The car used the Mini engine/gearbox and front subframe, but the rear subframe was replaced by a beam on which the Mini's trailing arms were hinged. The suspension was developed by ex-Team Lotus engineer Arthur Birchall.

Mark 2, Midas Bronze

Gordon Murray, technical director of Brabham, a British Formula One racing car manufacturer, became interested in the Midas, and at Dermott's invitation suggested some modifications to the car to make it more aerodynamic. Murray's suggestions were incorporated into the Midas Mark 2, introduced in 1981 and continuing in production until 1989. After the 1985 introduction of the Mark 3 "Midas Gold", the Mark 2 was sold as the Midas Bronze.

Mark 3: Midas Gold

The Midas Gold coupe was introduced in 1985, and first shown at Motorfair in London. The Mark 2 continued in production however, renamed the Midas Bronze. The Midas Gold convertible was introduced in 1989, "to much critical acclaim", but the Midas factory was destroyed by fire later that year, ending all production and pushing Midas Cars into liquidation.

Later developments
Pastiche Cars bought the rights to the Midas range in 1990, and relaunched the Midas Gold Convertible, albeit with a somewhat reduced specification. But after taking ten orders for the kit, none of which were supplied, Pastiche too went into liquidation, in 1991. GTM Cars then took over the rights to the Midas range and relaunched the brand at the Sandown Park Kit Car Show in August 1991. GTM introduced new models, including the 2+2 in coupé and convertible versions.

In 2001 GTM sold the Midas operation to Midas Cars, a new company based in Redditch and run by Marc Bailey. He renamed the 2+2 Coupé the Cortez, and the 2+2 Convertible as the Excelsior; the latter made its first public appearance at the Donnington Kit Car Show in September 2001. Bailey's operation was short-lived however, and Midas Cars ceased trading in 2003. The Midas marque then passed to Alternative Cars in early 2004.

References

Notes

Citations

Bibliography

Cars introduced in 1978